Parker Williams (May 31, 1872 – June 17, 1958) was a Welsh-born coal miner and political figure in British Columbia. He represented Newcastle in the Legislative Assembly of British Columbia from 1903 to 1918 as a Socialist and later as an independent Socialist.

He was born in 1872 and worked as a coal miner in Wales, Alberta and Washington state. Williams also worked on railways in Ontario and British Columbia. In 1891, he married Eleanor Price. Williams lived in Nanaimo. In 1917, he resigned his seat in the assembly after he was named a commissioner for the Worker's Compensation Board and he served in that function until he retired in April 1943. He also was responsible for administering the Mothers Pension Act and the Old Age Pension Act. Williams died at the age of 85 on his farm near Ladysmith.

References 

1873 births
1938 deaths
British Columbia Socialist Party MLAs